AZARA is a locality in the northwestern part of Guwahati, in Assam in northeastern India.

Azara Post Office (Established in the oldest Building of the locality) covers the area up to Chakardow towards the east, Greenland Nursing Home towards the South, Dharapur towards North and Garal-Bhattapara towards the West.

The residential areas of the locality are named as 'Para's, viz. Boripara, Kalitapara, Ganakpara, Maslaguwapara, Gosaipara, Keotpara, Hirapara, Bharalipara, Ojapara, Lapatul, Deoripara, Baruahpara etc. 'Sabhaghar' is the prime platform of the locality for promotion of socio-cultural activities. Several social groups come forward (due to less involvement of the Government and basically the concerned MLA) for the overall development of the areas through collection of funds with the Mobile Theatre (viz. Kohinoor, Awahan, Hengul, Bhagyadevi, Bordoichila, Rajtilak, Ashirwad, Itihas, Brindaban, Prarthona Shows and by Gift Coupon Games.

The following important offices are situated in the locality:

Azara Ozapara Lapatul Manasha Mandir, Azara Ozapara Lapatul Kalimandir, Azara Lapatul Pond, Azara 37 NH Kalimandir, Azara Sub Post Office (in Boripara), O/O the Circle Officer, Azara Revenue Circle(in Gaon Panchayat Road), O/O the Manager, APDCL, Azara Sub Division (in Gaon Panchayat Road), 33 no. Azara Gaon Panchayat Office (in Gaon Panchayat Road), Veterinary Hospital (in Gaon Panchayat Road), APWD Office (in Gadhuli Bazar), UCO Bank, Rani Branch(in Gadhuli Bazar), Bharat Scouts & Guides (in Bharalipara), Vijaya Bank, Dharapur Branch (in Bharalipara), Azara CHC (in Bharalipara) etc.

Transport and facilities
It has a railway station, and is also accessible by the citywide bus system.

The following educational facilities are located within the Azara locality: the College of Aeronautical Engineering, the Girijananda Chowdhury Institute of Management and Technology, The Assam Don Bosco University, Hari- Gayatri Das College, Rajdhar Bora H.S. School, Chandraprabha Bora Girls' High School, Nabin Ch. Bordoloi Balika Vidyalaya, Azara M.V. School, St. Joseph's School, Kendriya Vidyalaya Borjhar (link) along with Kidzee, Kid Veda, First Step Preschool (www.firststeppreschool.co.in), Kinderjoy.

Azara Godhuli Bazar is famous for its antique system  buying/selling (prices are determined by the volume)  of the local Fishes.

Air Force Colony is situated in Mountain Shadow here. One of the most beautiful part of the area, which is surrounded by mid high range hills giving a perfect scenic beauty to the place. The Air Force Colony has all facilities for defense families and has one of the best Schools.

BSF Colony is in Patgaon Area here.

Accoland, an amusement park is also located there.
Deepor Beel(lake) where Migratory birds from all over the world come every year from January to March season, declared as Ramsar site and Bird Sanctuary located in Azara.Decathlon is also here.

See also
 Noonmati
 Panjabari

References

Neighbourhoods in Guwahati